This is a list of megachurches affiliated with the Assemblies of God. A megachurch affiliated with the World Assemblies of God Fellowship having 2,000 or more worshippers for a typical weekly service. According to a 1996 statistic, nearly one in ten megachurches in the United States are affiliated with the General Council of the Assemblies of God.

Assemblies of God megachurches by country

Australia
Churches part of the Assemblies of God in Australia;
 Influencers Church in Paradise, Adelaide, SA (6,000)
 Horizon Church (formerly Shirelive Church) in Sutherland, Sydney, NSW (3,200)
 Garden City Christian Church in Mt Gravatt, Brisbane, QLD (3,000)
 Edge Church in Reynella, Adelaide, SA (3,000)
 Planetshakers City Church in East Melbourne, Melbourne, VIC (2,500)
 Inspire Church in Hoxton Park, Sydney, NSW (2,000)
 Calvary Christian Church in Buderim and Noosa, Sunshine Coast, QLD (2,000)
 Faith! Christian Church in Dandenong North, Melbourne, VIC (2,000)

Canada
There is 5 megachurches in Canada.
 Agincourt Pentecostal Church, Toronto, Ontario (2,370) 
 Central Community Church, St. Catharines, Ontario (2,200) 
 Christian Life Assembly, Langley, British Columbia (2,200) 
 Kennedy Road Tabernacle, Brampton, Ontario (2,000) 
 Portico, A Community Church, Mississauga, Ontario (2,500)

India
 New Life Assembly of God, Chennai (40,000)
 Bethel Assembly of God Church, Bethel AG Church, Bangalore (20,000)
 Hope Assembly of God Church,  Chennai (5,000)
 Full Gospel Assembly of God, Bangalore(25,000) 
 Mark Buntain Memorial Assembly of God Church (4,000)
 Victory International AG Church, Bangalore (4,000)
 Calvary AG Church, Salem, Tamil Nadu (3000)
 Calvary Assemblies of God, KGF Karnataka
 Bethel New Life International Church, India

New Zealand

 Auckland Samoan Assembly of God

Singapore
 Grace Assembly of God (4,000)
 Trinity Christian Centre (8,000)

Malaysia
 Calvary Church (10,000)

South Korea
 Yoido Full Gospel Church, Seoul (830,000)

United Kingdom

United States
The following list of megachurches affiliated with the Assemblies of God USA are taken from the denomination's official statistics and are ordered by average attendance of Sunday worship services:

 Dream Center, Los Angeles, California – 46,901
 Timberline Church, Fort Collins, Colorado – 16,604
 First Assembly of God, North Little Rock, Arkansas – 16,553
 New Life Covenant Assemblies of God, Chicago, Illinois – 15,375
 Dream City Church (formerly First Assembly of God), Phoenix, Arizona – 15,000
 James River Church, Ozark, Missouri – 11,000
 Calvary Church, Naperville, Illinois – 9,733
 Templo Calvario, Santa Ana, California – 8,750
 River Valley Church, Apple Valley, Minnesota – 8,643
 Grace Community Assembly of God, Whittier, California – 8,000
 Trinity Church, Cedar Hill, Texas – 7,521
 First Assembly of God, Fort Myers, Florida – 7,137
 River Church Favorday, Anaheim, California – 6,814
 First Assembly of God Life Center, Tacoma, Washington – 6,654
 King's Cathedral and Chapels, Kahului, Hawaii – 6,339
 Calvary Church Assembly of God, Irving, Texas – 6,046
 City First Church, Rockford, Illinois – 6,000
 Westover Hills Assembly of God, San Antonio, Texas – 5,712
 The House (formerly Calvary Temple Worship Center), Modesto, California – 5,500
 Faith Assembly of God, Orlando, Florida – 5,437
 Sheffield Family Life Center, Kansas City, Missouri – 5,423
 First Assembly of God, Griffin, Georgia – 5,317
 First Assembly of God, Grand Rapids, Michigan – 5,289
 Lighthouse Outreach Center, Waipahu, Hawaii – 5,110
 National Community Church, Washington, D.C. – 5,100
 People's Church, Oklahoma City, Oklahoma – 4,800
 Aguilas Centro Familiar Cristiano, Las Vegas, Nevada – 4,784
 Canyon Hills Assembly of God, Bakersfield, California – 4,500
 Iglesia El Calvario Assembly of God, Orlando, Florida – 4,500
 International Church, Las Vegas, Nevada – 4,500
 New Life Church, Renton, Washington – 4,205
 Victory Worship Center, Tucson, Arizona – 4,200
 Calvary Temple, Concord, California – 3,955
 Peoples Church, Fresno, California – 3,950
 Family Community Church, San Jose, California – 3,950
 Calvary Christian Center, Ormond Beach, Florida – 3,941
 Destiny Christian Church, Rocklin, California – 3,825
 Radiant Church, Surprise, Arizona – 3,763
 Promise Church (formerly known as Full Gospel New York Church), Flushing, New York – 3,751
 Newlife Church on the Peninsula, Silverdale, Washington – 3,665
 The Oaks Fellowship, Red Oak, Texas – 3,644
 Iglesia Cristiana Ebenezer, Garland, Texas – 3,500
 First Assembly of God, Concord, North Carolina – 3,425
 First Assembly of God, Victorville, California – 3,373
 Mission Ebenezer Family Church, Carson, California – 3,250
 Copper Pointe Church, Albuquerque, New Mexico – 3,250
 Cornerstone Church, Madison, Tennessee – 3,239
 Canvas Church, Kalispell, Montana – 3,225
 First Assembly of God, Visalia, California – 3,157
 Victory Christian Center, Lowellville, Ohio – 3,144
 Journey Church, Kenosha, Wisconsin – 3,082
 Emmanuel Christian Center, Minneapolis, Minnesota – 3,051
 LifePoint Church, Clarksville, Tennessee - 3,019
 Faith Assembly of God, Summerville, South Carolina – 3,003
 The Greenhouse Church, Gainesville, Florida – 2,999
 Capital Christian Center, Sacramento, California – 2,993
 Crosswinds Assembly of God, Sparks, Nevada – 2,935
 Christian Life Center, Fort Lauderdale, Florida – 2,910
 Glad Tidings Assembly of God, West Lawn, Pennsylvania – 2,902
 Gateway Fellowship Church, San Antonio, Texas – 2,900
 Brightmoor Christian Church, Novi, Michigan – 2,845
 The Church at Chapel Hill, Douglasville, Georgia – 2,803
 Church of Hope, Sarasota, Florida – 2,755
 Eastridge Church, Issaquah, Washington – 2,713
 Victory Church, Lakeland, Florida – 2,703
 Victorious Life Church, Wesley Chapel, Florida – 2,692
 LifeHouse Church, Hagerstown, Maryland – 2,686
 North Point Church, Springfield, Missouri – 2,660
 Oak Creek Assembly of God, Oak Creek, Wisconsin – 2,628
 Crossroads Church, Lafayette, Louisiana – 2,589
 Newbreak Church, San Diego, California – 2,563
 New Life Church, Alamo, California – 2,554
 Casa Del Rey, Albuquerque, New Mexico – 2,500
 Christ's Place, Lincoln, Nebraska – 2,383
 Assembly of God, Covina, California – 2,366
 Christian Life Center, Dayton, Ohio – 2,361
 Bonita Valley Community Church, Bonita, California – 2,312
 Bethany Christian Assembly, Everett, Washington – 2,312
 Victory Family Church, Norman, Oklahoma – 2,300
 Evergreen Christian Community, Olympia, Washington – 2,252
 First Assembly of God, Cape Girardeau, Missouri – 2,245
 The Peoples Church, Salem, Oregon – 2,215
 New Life Assembly of God, Lehigh Acres, Florida – 2,200
 Crossroads Community Cathedral, East Hartford, Connecticut – 2,171
 Lone Star Cowboy Church, Montgomery, Texas – 2,171
 Whittier Family Church, Whittier, California – 2,146
 Cornerstone Church, Bowie, Maryland – 2,127
 Evangel Assembly of God, Bismarck, North Dakota – 2,103
 South Hills Community Church, Corona, California – 2,100
 Journey Church, Fairview Park, Ohio – 2,100
 Walnut Park Assembly of God, Garland, Texas – 2,100
 Romanian Assembly of God, Portland, Oregon – 2,000
 Reach Church, Austin, Texas – 2,000
 Freedom Church, Carrollton, Texas – 2,000

References

Assemblies of God-related lists
Megachurches